KAKR may refer to:

 KAKR (FM), a radio station (103.7 FM) licensed to serve Akron, Colorado, United States
 Akron Executive Airport (ICAO code KAKR)